Alcinoe is a genus of ctenophores belonging to the family Ocyropsidae.

Species:

Alcinoe rosea 
Alcinoe vermicularis

References

Lobata